Maxcanú is a large town in the western part of the Mexican state of Yucatán; it  also functions as the seat for the Maxcanú Municipality.  It is located on Federal Highway 180, approximately 62 km (38.5 mi) south of Mérida.

The ancient Maya site of Oxkintok and the caves of Calcehtok are close to Maxcanú, while another ancient Maya settlement, Chunchucmil, is located ca. 25 kilometers west of the town.

Facilities available in Maxcanú include: internet cafes; grocery stores; fresh produce market; family restaurants; public telephones; DVD rental; hardware stores; bus station (for connections to Mérida and Campeche); and a "combi" taxi stand for travelling to local villages.

Maxcanú is the birthplace of Alfredo Barrera Vásquez, the noted Mexican anthropologist and Mayanist scholar who was the principal editor behind the Diccionario Cordemex, the influential Mayan-Spanish dictionary and orthography.

Climate

References

Populated places in Yucatán